Jason Lee Whitlock  (born April 27, 1967) is an American sports journalist, columnist, and podcaster. He hosts a program for the conservative media company Blaze Media titled Fearless with Jason Whitlock. Whitlock is a former columnist at The Kansas City Star, AOL Sports, Foxsports.com, and ESPN. He was a radio personality for WHB and KCSP sports stations in the Kansas City area. Whitlock played Division I college football at Ball State as an offensive lineman.

Journalism career

Early career
Whitlock's first job was working part-time for The Herald-Times in Bloomington, Indiana.  His first full-time job was as a reporter for The Charlotte Observer. After approximately one year there, he joined The Ann Arbor News in 1992 and spent two years covering the University of Michigan.

Kansas City Star
In 1994, Whitlock was hired by The Kansas City Star. In 1998, Whitlock was suspended for heckling fans at a Kansas City Chiefs game.

The Scripps Howard Foundation awarded Whitlock its National Journalism Award for commentary on March 7, 2008. Whitlock was the first sportswriter to win the award and $10,000 prize. On August 16, 2010, the Kansas City Star announced Whitlock's departure from that paper.

ESPN
In 2002, Whitlock started writing columns for ESPN.com's Page 2.  Whitlock had guest-hosted several ESPN TV shows, including Jim Rome Is Burning, and Pardon the Interruption. He was a regular fill-in host on The Jim Rome Show on Premiere Radio Networks.  He also appeared regularly on ESPN's The Sports Reporters.

Leaving ESPN for AOL Sports
In 2006, Whitlock announced the departure of his online column from ESPN.com's Page 2 in favor of AOL Sports, but initially expected to continue his television work for ESPN. However, after the announcement, Whitlock was interviewed by sports blog The Big Lead, and disparaged two of his ESPN colleagues. Whitlock labeled Mike Lupica "an insecure, mean-spirited busybody", and called Robert "Scoop" Jackson a "clown", saying that "the publishing of Jackson's fake ghetto posturing is an insult to black intelligence." Jackson, like Whitlock, is African-American. Whitlock then disappeared from all ESPN television work. He soon announced to The Kansas City Star readers in September 2006 that he was fired altogether from ESPN as a result of his remarks; he wrote that the company doesn't tolerate criticism and acted as they saw fit. Whitlock's first AOL Sports column was published September 29, 2006.

Fox Sports
Whitlock's first Fox Sports on MSN column was published August 16, 2007. 
On February 10, 2012, in the middle of the Knicks' 92–85 victory over the Los Angeles Lakers, with Jeremy Lin scoring a career-high 38 points, Whitlock posted on Twitter, stating that "some lucky lady in NYC is gonna feel a couple inches of pain tonight." Silvie Kim wrote in Hyphen that Whitlock "reinforced the insipid and insidious 'small Asian penis' stereotype. The Asian American Journalists Association demanded an apology. Later, Whitlock said, "I debased a feel-good sports moment. For that, I'm truly sorry."

Return to ESPN
Whitlock originally expected to be an integral part of the launching of the Fox Sports 1 sports television channel in August 2013, but then came to feel that television work would come at the expense of his writing.  Therefore, upon meeting with ESPN President John Skipper, Whitlock decided to leave Fox Sports and accept Skipper's offer to return to ESPN. His new website 'The Undefeated.com' was scheduled to launch on ESPN.com sometime in the summer of 2015. After over a year and a half of delays, ESPN announced that Whitlock would no longer serve as the editor in chief for 'The Undefeated', replaced on an interim basis by Leon Carter, the editorial director for the site.  In October 2015, Whitlock's employment at ESPN ended.

Return to Fox
In 2016, Whitlock began a new show airing on Fox Sports 1, Speak for Yourself with Cowherd and Whitlock. Cowherd was replaced by former Buffalo Bills defensive end Marcellus Wiley in 2018, and the show was rebranded as Speak for Yourself with Whitlock and Wiley. On June 1, 2020, it was announced that Fox would not renew Whitlock's contract after the two sides couldn't come to an agreement.

OutKick 
In June 2020, Jason Whitlock officially partnered alongside Clay Travis at OutKick. In January 2021, Travis announced Whitlock's departure. Whitlock's immediate response was a tweet: "Do not believe anything written or said about me unless I say it. All else is Fake News." A month later, he gave an interview to Front Office Sports in which he said, in part, "It was a bad business deal, a byproduct of my failure to properly vet my business partners."

Blaze Media
In June 2021, Whitlock joined Blaze Media and started a new show, Fearless with Jason Whitlock. In an interview with Tucker Carlson, Whitlock stated that "a lot of what the left supports is Satanic".

Other work
Whitlock has also been published in Vibe, Playboy, and The Sporting News. In the June 2008 issue of Playboy, he wrote a 5,000-word column questioning America's incarceration and drug-war policies. Playboy headlined the column "The Black KKK", which provoked Whitlock into writing two columns, one in the Kansas City Star and another on Foxsports.com, criticizing Playboy editorial director Chris Napolitano for the misleading and inflammatory headline.

References

External links
National Journalism Award Winners 2008
In KC, it's no time for a game

1967 births
Living people
African-American writers
Writers from Indianapolis
American sports radio personalities
American sportswriters
American podcasters
Ball State Cardinals football players
Ball State University alumni
Blaze Media people
Commentary YouTubers
People from Overland Park, Kansas
The Kansas City Star people
ESPN people
Writers from Los Angeles
Players of American football from Indianapolis
Writers from Kansas City, Missouri
Radio personalities from Kansas City, Missouri
Radio personalities from Los Angeles
Fox Sports 1 people
American YouTubers
News YouTubers
American sports journalists
African-American sports journalists
21st-century American journalists
YouTube podcasters